Houssay may refer to:
 Bernardo Houssay (1887–1971), Argentine physiologist and Nobel Prize winner
 Houssay, Loir-et-Cher, a commune in the Loir-et-Cher department, France
 Houssay, Mayenne, a commune in the Mayenne department, France
 Houssay (crater), a lunar impact crater located on the lunar far side near the northern pole